WHYN-FM (93.1 MHz "Mix 93.1") is a commercial radio station licensed to Springfield, and serving the Pioneer Valley of Western Massachusetts. It is owned by iHeartMedia and airs a hot adult contemporary format. Aside from a period between 1985 and 1987 when the call sign was WHFM, the station has had the call letters WHYN-FM since it first signed on in 1947.

The signal can be heard as far south as South Central Connecticut and as far north as parts of Vermont and New Hampshire. WHYN-FM's studios and offices are in downtown Springfield's "Marketplace" location, along with sister stations 560 WHYN (talk radio), and 100.9 WRNX (country music).

History
Originally licensed to serve Holyoke, WHYN-FM went on the air December 1, 1947, transmitting from a facility on Mount Tom shared with WMAS-FM in Springfield and WACE-FM in Chicopee. All three stations launched with a joint inaugural program from the Hotel Sheraton in Springfield, which was simulcast on their AM sister stations and on Springfield's incumbent FM station, WBZA-FM. By 1953, when WHYN-TV (now WGGB-TV) signed on from Mount Tom, only WHYN-FM was still transmitting from the mountain, as WMAS-FM had moved to the WMAS (now WHLL) tower in Springfield and WACE-FM had shut down; that year, the city of license was changed to Springfield.

Until the early 1960s, WHYN-FM primarily simulcast WHYN. By the mid-1960s, WHYN-FM began separate programming from its AM counterpart's Top 40 format.  The format chosen, which had similarities to beautiful music but primarily used vocals, was commonly known as "MOR" (middle of the road music) and was syndicated as "Format 44" around the country.  The DJs played several uninterrupted songs followed by a stop-set (commercial break) and then would announce what was heard.  Unlike the rock and roll formats of the era, the musical introductions of songs were not talked over and there was usually a little dead air between the songs, all to create an easy-going sound.  The jingles used on the air were mainly lengthy cuts provided by Pepper-Tanner (now TM Studios), and in 1974, WHYN-FM was the pilot station for William B. Tanner's "Easy Going" jingle series.  WHYN's long-time morning team consisted of Frank Knight and news man Ron Russell (DeMatteo).  A number of other radio personalities worked on the station including Dave Mack, Bob Holland (a/k/a Holland Cooke), Rich Roy (later on WHYN) and others.

WHYN-FM continued to program an "Easy Listening" format late into the 1970s.  After being purchased by Affiliated Communications, the station's format was switched to a more adult contemporary music format geared towards 18–54 female demographics.  At that point, Frank Knight and Ron Russell exited to be the morning team on Lapin Communications' 1450 WMAS for that station's Music Of Your Life adult standards format.

In the mid-1980s, WHYN-AM-FM was sold to R&R Broadcasting.  The decision was made, by group program director Alan Anderson, to change the call letters to WHFM and program a soft AC format and geared not just to the Springfield media market but also larger, more lucrative Hartford market.  The IDs at the top of the hour quietly stated the Springfield city of license and the concept was that the station was "The Giant", a mythological entity broadcasting down to all of the people.  After several months, it became obvious this approach was not working.  Larry Caringer, hired by Anderson as assistant program director and morning host was given the reins as PD.  With Mary Ferrero as music director, the two fashioned a blend of rock and pop and within one rating period, WHFM was number one in the 18–49 demographic.  "Caringer and Friends" was the number one morning show in Springfield.

In late 1987, WHFM was sold to Wilks-Schwartz Broadcasting.  The purchase of WHYN and WHFM involved a swap, of sorts.  Federal Communications Commission (FCC) rules, at the time, did not allow multiple ownership of stations in a market.  So, in order to sell rock-formatted 102.1 WAQY, Wilks-Schwartz had to agree to change the format of their new FM (WHFM) to something that did not compete with WAQY.  At the same time, WHFM reverted to its original WHYN-FM call sign.  Much of the air staff and other employees were fired.  However, Caringer, Ferrero and Casey Palmer remained on-air.  Caringer stayed on as PD through the format change, eventually giving up the position when it became obvious he was no longer the program director – but, simply an order taker from the consultant in Seattle.  "Caringer and Friends" News Guy, Bill Hess took the PD position.  Several weeks later, Hess fired Caringer – and took over the morning show.  (Caringer had just been voted "Most Popular Radio Personality" by The Valley Advocate.)  Ann Strong did mid-days and Casey Palmer was the afternoon jock.  Evening DJ Mary Ferrero, who lost her position to Strong, exited to become the production director at WMAS-AM-FM and Jennifer Fox took her place.

WHYN and WHYN-FM were later sold by Wilks-Schwartz to Radio Equity Partners who later sold to Clear Channel Communications (now iHeartMedia) in 1996. The station hired news guy Tony Gill who had worked in the Boston market at radio stations WBZ and WRKO. He served as special assistant to Mayor Ray Flynn's communications office. While at WHYN, Gill was hired by WTIC-TV as a general assignment reporter.

WHYN-FM for many years was known as "93WHYN" and was an adult contemporary station that also blended in oldies from the 1950s and 1960s in with its playlist. The station also aired "Jukebox Saturday Night", a program DJ Frank Holler started on WDRC-FM, along with an oldies show with Phil D-e-e (Drumheller), which initially aired on Fridays, then moving to Saturdays after the departure of Frank Holler in 1997. The program was moved to WHYN in 1999. The station began evolving into a "hot adult contemporary" format by the late 1990s, and in 2000, WHYN-FM was rebranded as a "Mix" station similar to Clear Channel's other "Mix" stations across the nation.

Mix was home to the Dan (Williams) and Kim (Zachary) morning show, which had been broadcasting on Springfield radio for more than 15 years before the two were let go in late 2011. The Dan and Kim morning show originally began on WHYN in 1995 before switching over to the FM in 1997. Dan had gone through a series of morning co-hosts following some ownership and program director changes.  Kim replaced Bo Sullivan as Dan's co-host and the show improved in the ratings almost immediately. Evenings were being "voice tracked" by Jennifer Fox (who was working at Clear Channel in Vermont).  Due to budget constraints, they fired her in late 2006 and was replaced by the syndicated John Tesh show at night. Evenings are back to being voicetracked by Cindy Spicer from San Diego.

Dan Williams was the longest continual employee of WHYN having started in the mid-1970s when Guy Gannett Broadcasting was the owner and before they split off the radio and television stations.

Translator

References

External links
Mix 93.1 website
97.3 The Beat website

HYN-FM
Radio stations established in 1947
Hot adult contemporary radio stations in the United States
Mass media in Springfield, Massachusetts
1947 establishments in Massachusetts
IHeartMedia radio stations